The Utah Olympic Park Track is a bobsleigh, luge, and skeleton track in the United States, located in the Utah Olympic Park near Park City, Utah. During the 2002 Winter Olympics in nearby Salt Lake City, the track hosted the bobsleigh, luge, and skeleton events. Today the track still serves as a training center for Olympic and development level athletes and hosts numerous local and international competitions. It is one of two national tracks; the other is at Mt. Van Hoevenberg near Lake Placid, New York.

History

In 1989, Utah's voters passed the Olympic referendum, allowing taxpayer money to be used to construct a winter sports park, which would include the track. The park would be used if Salt Lake City won its bid for either the 1998 or 2002 Winter Olympics and following the games, Olympic funds and revenue would then be used to repay the state. In 1990, the Utah Sports Authority announced their plans to build the park, which included ski jumps and a bobsled/luge track, in Bear Hollow near Park City.

The following year, on June 15, 1991, Salt Lake City lost its 1998 Winter Olympics bid by four votes to Nagano, Japan. Still, construction on the park commenced following a groundbreaking ceremony on May 29, 1991. The original estimated cost of the park was $26.3 million and included the ski jumps, bobsled/luge track, and a day lodge; following the completion of the ski jumps they were formally dedicated in a ceremony on January 9, 1993. The track was designed by German luge coach Josef Lenz.

A ceremony on June 3, 1994, signaled the start of construction on the bobsled/luge track. The track was completed December 28, 1996 and its grand opening ceremony was held on January 25, 1997. The very first run on the new track was by luger Jon Owen on January 10, 1997. Following the completion of the track it was decided to reintroduce skeleton as an Olympic event during the 2002 Winter Olympics and plans called to use the track to host all three sliding three events.

While construction was progressing on the track, Salt Lake City had won its 1995 bid to host the 2002 Winter Olympics, and plans were developed to expand the park. On October 9, 1997, the Salt Lake Organizing Committee (SLOC) authorized the plan to spend an additional $48 million to upgrade and expand the recently completed park. The plans called for the construction of starting houses on the track, chairlifts, storage buildings, and new access roads. Ownership of the Park was transferred to SLOC from the Utah Sports Authority on July 14, 1999, and soon after the park's name was changed from the Utah Winter Sports Park to the Utah Olympic Park.

During the 2002 games, the track hosted 74,187 bobsleigh spectators, 14,860 skeleton spectators, and 64,104 luge spectators.

Track technical details

Costing about $25 million to construct, the track uses 297,000 watts of track lighting, 62 water hydrants (for ice- and snowmaking), 24 cameras, eight scoreboards, and 49 timing points. Generally open from October to the end of March annually, the track takes a total of 18 days to ice down to the required thickness needed to run sliding events. During the operating season, a nine-man crew smooths the track daily. A total of 59 temperature probes are located throughout the track to ensure the ice temperature is properly monitored. Throughout the track, a $1 million retractable shading system protects the course from sun and snow, which reduces energy usage by 25 percent and the need to clear the track from snow.

Statistics

The turn names were given by John Morgan during Speed Channel's World Cup bobsleigh coverage on December 17 & 23, 2006. All curves shown are bobsleigh. Men's singles' luge joins after turn two while women's singles and men's doubles luge joins after turn three. Turns 1, 2, 3, 13, and 15 do not have turn names. The section between curves 14 and 15 is the fastest, leading into a long finish straight that was referred to by Morgan as the "Graveyard" section because you could lose both time and speed if you hit the walls leading to that turn.

Championships hosted
Winter Olympics: 2002
FIL World Luge Championships: 2005
Skeleton World Cup: 2006, 2007, 2008, 2009, 2010, 2011, 2013, 2014, 2016
Luge World Cup: 2001, 2003,2004, 2007, 2011, 2014, 2016

References

External links
Utah Olympic Legacy Foundation – Official website
International Bobsleigh and Skeleton Federation (FIBT) – Track profile
International Luge Federation (FIL) – Track profile

Venues of the 2002 Winter Olympics
Olympic bobsleigh venues
Olympic luge venues
Olympic skeleton venues
Bobsleigh, luge, and skeleton tracks
Sports venues in Utah
Sports venues in Summit County, Utah
Sports venues completed in 1997
Buildings and structures in Park City, Utah